2015 was designated by the United Nations as:
 International Year of Light
 International Year of Soil


Events

January
 January 1
The Eurasian Economic Union comes into effect, creating a political and economic union between Russia, Belarus, Armenia, Kazakhstan and Kyrgyzstan.
 Lithuania officially adopts the euro as its currency, replacing the litas, and becomes the nineteenth Eurozone country.
 January 3–7 – A series of massacres in Baga, Nigeria and surrounding villages by Boko Haram kills more than 2,000 people.
January 7 – Two gunmen belonging to Al-Qaeda's Yemen branch kill 12 people and injure 11 more at the Paris headquarters of satirical newspaper Charlie Hebdo, prompting an anti-terrorism demonstration attended by over a million people and more than 40 world leaders.
 January 12 – A Boko Haram and Islamic State assault on Kolofata in the Far North Region of Cameroon is repelled by the Cameroonian Army, who kill 143 Boko Haram and Islamic State insurgents.
 January 15 – The Swiss National Bank abandons the cap on the franc's value relative to the euro, causing turmoil in international financial markets.
 January 22 – After Houthi forces seize the presidential palace, Yemeni President Abd Rabbuh Mansur Hadi resigns after months of unrest.
 January 25 –  Legislative elections are held in Greece to elect all 300 members of the Hellenic Parliament and the SYRIZA party, led by Alexis Tsipras, comes out as the largest party winning 149 out of 300 seats.

February
 February 12 
 Leaders from Russia, Ukraine, Germany and France reach an agreement on the war in eastern Ukraine that includes a ceasefire and withdrawal of heavy weapons. However, several days later, the Ukrainian government and pro-Russian rebels claim that, within its first day, the ceasefire was broken 139 times, as both sides failed to withdraw their heavy weapons and fighting had continued.
 The United Nations Security Council adopts Resolution 2199 to combat terrorism. 
 February 16 – The Egyptian military begins conducting airstrikes against a branch of the Islamic militant group ISIL in Libya in retaliation for the group's beheading of over a dozen Egyptian Christians.

March
 March 5–8 – The ancient city sites of Nimrud, Hatra and Dur-Sharrukin in Iraq are demolished by the Islamic State of Iraq and the Levant.
 March 6 – NASA's Dawn probe enters orbit around Ceres, becoming the first spacecraft to visit a dwarf planet.
 March 12 – The Islamic State of Iraq and the Levant becomes allies with fellow jihadist group Boko Haram, effectively annexing the group.
 March 20 – A total solar eclipse was visible in the north Atlantic, Faroe Islands, and Svalbard. It was the 61st eclipse of the 120th saros cycle which started on May 27, 933 AD and will end on July 7, 2195, which is 180 years ahead of 2015.
 March 24 – An Airbus A320-211 operated by Germanwings is deliberately crashed in the French Alps, killing all 150 people on board.
 March 25 – A Saudi Arabia-led coalition of Arab countries starts a military intervention in Yemen in order to uphold the Yemeni government in its fight against the Houthis' southern offensive.
 March 29 – Australia wins the 2015 Cricket World Cup.

April
 April 2 – 148 people are killed, the majority students, in a mass shooting at the Garissa University College in Kenya, perpetrated by the militant terrorist organization al-Shabaab.
 April 4 – A total lunar eclipse was visible in Asia, Australia, Pacific and Americas. It was a shallow total lunar eclipse, with 0.08% of that diameter inside of Earth's umbral shadow, and it was the 30th eclipse of the 132nd saros cycle, which began with a penumbral lunar eclipse in Earth's penumbral northern edge of the shadow on May 12, 1492, and will conclude with another penumbral lunar eclipse in Earth's penumbral southern edge of the shadow on June 26, 2754.
 April 25 – A magnitude 7.8 earthquake strikes Nepal and causes 8,857 deaths in Nepal, 130 in India, 27 in China and 4 in Bangladesh with a total of 9,018 deaths.
 April 29 – The World Health Organization (WHO) declares that rubella has been eradicated from the Americas.

May
 May 1 – October 31 – Expo 2015 is held in Milan, Italy.
 May 7 – the 2015 UK General Election results in the first Conservative majority government in 18 years.
 May 8 – a prison break occured in the Iraqi town of Al Khalis, resulting in over fifty escapees.
 May 10 – First round of the 2015 Polish presidential election is held.
 May 11–12 – Version O of Les Femmes d'Alger by Pablo Picasso sells for US$179.3 million at Christie's auction in New York, while the sculpture L'Homme au doigt by Alberto Giacometti sells for US$141.3 million, setting a new world record for a painting and for a sculpture, respectively.
 May 12 – A second major earthquake in Nepal, measuring 7.3 on the moment magnitude scale, results in 153 deaths in Nepal, 62 in India, 1 in China and 2 in Bangladesh with a total of 218 deaths.
 May 19–23 – The Eurovision Song Contest 2015 is held in Vienna, Austria, and is won by Swedish entrant Måns Zelmerlöw with the song "Heroes".
 May 21 – ISIS captures the ancient city of Palmyra in Syria.
 May 24 – Second round of the 2015 Polish presidential election is held, with Andrzej Duda reigning victorious over then-incumbent president Bronisław Komorowski.

June
 June 2 – FIFA President Sepp Blatter announces his intention to resign amidst an FBI-led corruption investigation, and calls for an extraordinary congress to elect a new president as soon as possible.
 June 6 – The governments of India and Bangladesh officially ratify their 1974 agreement to exchange enclaves along their border.
 June 12–28 – The inaugural European Games are held in Baku, Azerbaijan.
 June 25–26 – ISIL claim responsibility for three attacks around the world during Ramadan:
Kobanî massacre: ISIL fighters detonate three car bombs, enter Kobanî, Syria, and open fire at civilians, killing more than 220.
 Sousse attacks: 22-year-old Seifeddine Rezgui opens fire at a tourist resort at Port El Kantaoui, Tunisia, killing 38 people.
 Kuwait mosque bombing: A suicide bomber attacks the Shia Mosque Imam Ja'far as-Sadiq at Kuwait City, Kuwait, killing 27 people and injuring 227 others. 

 June 30 – Cuba becomes the first country in the world to eradicate mother-to-child transmission of HIV and syphilis.

July
July 1 – Greek government-debt crisis: Greece becomes the first advanced economy to miss a payment to the International Monetary Fund in the 71-year history of the IMF.
July 5–13 – Greek government-debt crisis: After six months of clashes and futile negotiations between Greece's newly elected, leftist government and the country's creditors, over the austerity measures imposed through bailout programmes, tension peaks as Greece votes in a referendum to reject the terms offered in a third programme; however, the government eventually proceeds to concur to harsher terms than those offered before, in what was widely characterized as a coup on the creditors' part.
July 14 
 NASA's New Horizons spacecraft performs a close flyby of Pluto, becoming the first spacecraft in history to visit the distant world. 
 Iran agrees to long-term limits of its nuclear program in exchange for sanctions relief.
July 20 – Cuba and the United States, ending 54 years of hostility between the nations, reestablish full diplomatic relations.
July 24 – Turkey begins a series of airstrikes against PKK and ISIL targets after the 2015 Suruç bombing.
July 31 – The International Olympic Committee awards Beijing the right to host the 2022 Winter Olympics.

August
August 5 – Debris found on Réunion Island is confirmed to be that of Malaysia Airlines Flight 370, missing since March 2014.
August 12 and 15 — Large explosions in Tianjin, China kill 173 and injure more than 800 people. The causes of the explosions were found to be an overheated container of dry nitrocellulose and around 800 tonnes of ammonium nitrate.
August 17 – A bombing takes place inside the Erawan Shrine at the Ratchaprasong intersection in Pathum Wan District, Bangkok, Thailand, killing 20 people and injuring 125.
August 23 – A UAE military intelligence operation in the country of Yemen frees one British hostage.

September
 September 10 – Scientists announce the discovery of Homo naledi, a previously unknown species of early human in South Africa.
 September 13 – A partial solar eclipse was visible in South Africa, south Indian and Antarctica. It was the 54th eclipse of the 125th saros cycle which began with a partial solar eclipse on February 4, 1060, and will end on April 9, 2358.
 September 14
 First observation of gravitational waves: Gravitational waves are detected for the first time, by LIGO. This is not announced until February 11, 2016.
 Malcolm Turnbull defeats Tony Abbott in a Liberal Party leadership ballot. Turnbull becomes Prime Minister of Australia, being sworn in the following day.
 September 16 – An 8.4 earthquake strikes 46 km from  Coquimbo (in Chile). 15 people are killed and 20 more injured.
 September 18 – October 31 – The 2015 Rugby World Cup is held in England and is won by New Zealand
 September 18 – Automaker Volkswagen is alleged to have been involved in worldwide rigging of diesel emissions tests, affecting an estimated 11 million vehicles globally.
 September 20  – Snap legislative elections are held in Greece, following the resignation of prime minister Alexis Tsipras, to elect all 300 members of the Hellenic Parliament and the SYRIZA party, led by Alexis Tsipras comes out as the largest party winning 145 out of 300 seats.
 September 24 – A stampede during the Hajj pilgrimage in Mecca kills at least 2,200 people and injures more than 900 others, with more than 650 missing.
 September 28 – NASA announces that liquid water has been found on Mars.
 September 30 – Russia begins air strikes against ISIL and anti-government forces in Syria, in support of the Syrian government.

October
 October 3 – A United States airstrike on a Médecins Sans Frontières (Doctors Without Borders) hospital in Afghanistan kills an estimated 20 people.
 October 10 – A series of suicide bombings kills at least 100 people at a peace rally in Ankara, Turkey, and injures more than 400 others.
 October 23 – Hurricane Patricia becomes the most intense hurricane ever recorded in the Western Hemisphere and the second strongest worldwide, with winds of 215 mph and a pressure of 872 mbar.
 October 25 – The 2015 Polish parliamentary election is held for the Sejm of the Republic of Poland, with the election being won by the largest opposition party, the right-wing Law and Justice (PiS).
 October 26 – A magnitude 7.5 earthquake strikes the Hindu Kush region and causes 398 deaths, with 279 in Pakistan, 115 in Afghanistan and 4 in India.
October 30 – Colectiv nightclub fire, a deadly fire killed 64 people, including 4 members of the metalcore band Goodbye to Gravity, in Colectiv nightclub in Bucharest, Romania
 October 31 – Metrojet Flight 9268, an Airbus A321 airliner en route to Saint Petersburg from Sharm el-Sheikh, crashes near Al-Hasana in Sinai, killing all 217 passengers and 7 crew members on board. Later investigations revealed a bomb was likely responsible for the crash with Islamic State being the primary suspect.

November
 November 4 – After a brief period of protests, triggered by the Colectiv nightclub fire, the Romanian prime-minister Victor Ponta resigns, ending a 3 years unrest period in Romania. The protests would continue until November 9. 
 November 7 – CPC general secretary Xi Jinping and ROC president Ma Ying-jeou formally meet for the first time.
 November 12 – Two suicide bombers detonated explosives in Bourj el-Barajneh, Beirut, killing 43 people and injuring over 200 others.
 November 13 – Multiple terrorist attacks claimed by Islamic State of Iraq and the Levant (ISIL) in Paris, France, result in 130 fatalities.
 November 24 – Turkey shoots down a Russian fighter jet on the Turkish–Syrian border in the first case of a NATO member destroying a Russian aircraft since the 1950s.
 November 30 – The 2015 United Nations Climate Change Conference (COP 21) is held in Paris, attended by leaders from 147 nations.

December
December 2 – Two gunmen open fire at a workplace in San Bernardino, California, killing 14 before dying themselves in a shootout with police. ISIL claimed responsibility.
 December 12 – A global climate change pact is agreed at the COP 21 summit, committing all countries to reduce carbon emissions for the first time.
 December 15 – The Islamic Military Counter Terrorism Coalition is formed in order to fight terrorism.
 December 22 – SpaceX lands an uncrewed Falcon 9 rocket, the first reusable rocket to successfully enter orbital space and return.

Births and Deaths

Nobel Prizes

 Chemistry – Paul L. Modrich; Aziz Sancar and Tomas Lindahl
 Economics – Angus Deaton
 Literature – Svetlana Alexievich
 Peace – Tunisian National Dialogue Quartet
 Physics – Takaaki Kajita and Arthur B. McDonald
 Physiology or Medicine – William C. Campbell, Satoshi Ōmura and Tu Youyou

New English words
aphantasia
aquafaba
cloud kitchen
extreme risk protection order
ghost kitchen
red flag law

See also
2010s in political history
List of international years

References

Popular culture
In the time travel film Back to the Future, Part II, Doc Brown, Marty McFly, and Marty's girlfriend, Jennifer Parker, travel to October 21, 2015, to prevent some problems with Marty and Jennifer's future children.   Jennifer is knocked out with a sleep-inducing alpha-rhythm generator, and remains asleep for the rest of the movie, until Back to the Future, Part III.